John Ivar Nilson (12 March 1919 – 31 October 1970) was  an Australian rules footballer who played with Collingwood in the Victorian Football League (VFL).

Family
Nilson was of Finnish heritage and his mother, Suleima Elizabeth Siuro (c1893-1919), a domestic servant, tragically died in Melbourne, on 15 March 1919, from the 1919 influenza epidemic three days after his birth.

He was then adopted by Swedish immigrants, Bror Edvard Nilsson (a.k.a. Nilson) (−1956), and Ida Ingeborg Nilson (1882–1937), née Gröndahl (a.k.a. Greendale), who lived in West Brunswick.

He married Gwendoline Claire Johnson (1922–1985) on 11 April 1942. They had three children.

War service
Nilson also served in the 58th Battalion of the Second AIF during World War II.

Notes

References
 B883, V44607: World War Two Service Record: Private John Ivar Nilson (V44607), (documents not yet examined for release), National Archives of Australia.
 World War Nominal Roll: Private John Ivar Nilson (V44607), Department of Veterans' Affairs.
 High Tower Diving, The Argus, (Friday, 17 January 1947), p.12.
 High Tower, The (Sydney) Sun, (Sunday, 19 January 1947), p.9.
 Gould Retains Diving Title, The Sporting Globe, (Saturday, 31 January 1948), p.5.
 Takes Plunge, The Argus, (Monday, 7 February 1949), p.6.
 They Fly Through the Air, The Age, (Thursday, 16 November 1950), p.4.

External links 

Jack Nilson's playing statistics from The VFA Project
Profile on Collingwood Forever

1919 births
1970 deaths
Australian rules footballers from Melbourne
Collingwood Football Club players
Brunswick Football Club players
Australian Army personnel of World War II
Australian Army soldiers
People from Brunswick, Victoria
Australian people of Finnish descent
Military personnel from Melbourne